Gambrinus is a beer brewed in the Czech Republic at the Pilsner Urquell Brewery. It is one of the most popular beers in the Czech Republic. The beer is named after Gambrinus, a legendary European king known for his mythical brewing abilities. The company was founded in 1869.

Beers 

Gambrinus brews these different types of beer, which are supplied by Plzeňský Prazdroj:

 Gambrinus Original 10 – the most popular Gambrinus beer in the Czech Republic, 4,3% ABV.
 Gambrinus Plná 12 – a 12° pale lager, 5% ABV.
 Gambrinus Unpasteurized 10/12 – an unpasteurized pale lager, 4.2/5.2% ABV.
 Gambrinus Unfiltered Lager – an unfiltered, unpasteurized yeast pale lager, 4.8% ABV.
 Gambrinus Polotmavá 12 – an amber 12° lager, 5.2% ABV.
 Gambrinus Dry – a special brew with lowered amounts of sugar, 4.0% ABV.
 Gambrinus Flavoured – a canned pale beer, flavored with Lime/Elderberry/Lemon/Grapefruit.

Other beers marketed under the Gambrinus name 

This brand is used by many other breweries in Germany and Denmark and has been used in the United States. In Mendig (Rhineland-Palatinate) the Gambrinusfest beer festival is held every two years.

 Gambrinus Brewery in Weiden in der Oberpfalz, Germany
 Gambrinus Brewery in Oberhaid, Germany
 Gambrinus Brewery in Nagold, Germany
 Gambrinus Brewery in Naila, Germany
 Mohrenbrauerei August Huber Brewery has the black beer Gambrinus, Vorarlberg, Austria
 Hancock Brewery has the beer Old Gambrinus, Skive, Denmark
 Brauerei Ottakringer has the beer Gambrinus, Vienna, Austria
 Grivita Brewery has the beer Gambrinus, Bucharest, Romania
 August Wagner Breweries in Columbus, Ohio, United States (Defunct; Production rights acquired by the Pittsburgh Brewing Company; Company founder August Wagner was a native of Bavaria)

See also 

 Beer in the Czech Republic
 Gambrinus, patron saint of beer.

References

External links 

 Gambrinus Official Site

Beer in the Czech Republic
Beer brands of the Czech Republic